Angela Johnson (born 8 December 1953) is a Canadian basketball player. She competed in the women's tournament at the 1976 Summer Olympics.

Awards and honors
Top 100 U Sports women's basketball Players of the Century (1920-2020).

Member of Manitoba Sports Hall of Fame (inducted 2007)

References

External links
 

1953 births
Living people
Canadian women's basketball players
Olympic basketball players of Canada
Basketball players at the 1976 Summer Olympics
Manitoba Sports Hall of Fame inductees
Sportspeople from Preston, Lancashire